The Faroe Islands national badminton team represents Faroe Islands in international badminton team competitions. It is controlled by the Faroe Islands Badminton Association (Faroese: Badmintonsamband Føroya), the governing body for badminton in Faroe Islands. 

The Faroese mixed team once participated the Sudirman Cup in 2003.

Participation in BWF competitions
In the 2003 Sudirman Cup, the Faroese team was placed into the Group 7 classification group alongside Jamaica, Suriname and Turkey. The Faroe Islands lost the group ties and had a close fight in the tie with Suriname. The Faroe Islands lost with a score of 2-3 to Suriname. They finished in 50th place.
Sudirman Cup

Participation in Helvetia Cup

Participation in Island Games 
The Faroese team achieved runners-up position in the 2015 Island Games and were semifinalists at the 2019 Island Games.

Mixed team

Participation in European Junior Team Badminton Championships
Mixed Team

Current squad 

Men
Árant á Mýrini
Magnus Dal-Christiansen
Jónas Djurhuus
Rannvá Djurhuus Carlsson
Niklas Højgaard Eysturoy
Benjamin Gunnarstein

Women
Brynhild Djurhuus Carlsson
Kristina Eriksen
Sólfríð Hjørleifsdóttir
Gunnva Jacobsen
Lena Maria Joensen
Adhya Nandi
Bartal Poulsen
Askel Eli Poulsen
Sissal Thomsen

References

Badminton
National badminton teams
Badminton in the Faroe Islands